Judith Anne Hancock AM (born 25 August 1937) is a long retired Australian educator and high school principal.

Hancock became principal of Brisbane Girls Grammar School in 1977. The Hancock Communication Centre at the school is named after her.

In 2000, Hancock was appointed a Member of the Order of Australia.

References

Living people
1937 births
Members of the Order of Australia
Australian headmistresses